James Wilfred Roberts (April 9, 1940 – October 23, 2015), known as Jim Roberts or Jimmy Roberts, was a Canadian ice hockey defenceman and forward. He went by both nicknames of Jimmy and Jim.

After playing for future Montreal Canadiens coach Scotty Bowman with the OHA junior Peterborough Petes, Roberts was signed by the Canadiens and turned pro with the Montreal Royals minor league team in 1959.  In the 1964 season, he saw his first NHL action with Montreal and remained the next several seasons, winning two Stanley Cups before becoming the first selection of the St. Louis Blues in 1967 NHL Expansion Draft.  He played solidly for the Blues for five seasons, being named the team captain in 1971 before his trade back to Montreal, where he played for three more Cup winners.  Roberts rejoined the Blues for one final season in 1978 before his retirement. He was renowned for his defensive skills and often used as a "shadow" against high scoring enemy forwards.

After his retirement as a player, Roberts was an interim coach of the Buffalo Sabres under his old mentor Bowman before coaching the Springfield Indians of the American Hockey League to back-to-back Calder Cup championships in 1990 and 1991, after which he was named the head coach of the Hartford Whalers.  He went on to be the coach and general manager of the Worcester IceCats of the AHL for two seasons before moving on to be an assistant coach with the St. Louis parent club between 1996–2000, including a short stint as the interim head coach in 1997.

Roberts played in 1006 NHL games, scoring 126 goals and 194 assists for 320 points, and playing in three All-Star Games in 1965, 1969 and 1970. Jimmy Roberts name was engraved on the Stanley Cup in 1965, 1966, 1973, 1976, 1977 (all with Montreal).

Roberts died October 23, 2015 of cancer, which had been diagnosed weeks prior.

On October 27, 2015 the St. Louis Blues announced they were going to wear helmet decals for the home stand that read "JR" in the lower left corner of the helmet.

Career statistics

Coaching statistics

See also
List of NHL players with 1,000 games played

References

External links

1940 births
2015 deaths
Deaths from cancer in Missouri
Buffalo Sabres coaches
Canadian ice hockey defencemen
Hartford Whalers coaches
Montreal Canadiens players
Pittsburgh Penguins coaches
St. Louis Blues coaches
St. Louis Blues players
Ice hockey people from Toronto
Stanley Cup champions
Canadian ice hockey coaches